Someone at a Distance is a 1953 novel by the British writer Dorothy Whipple. A French au pair ruthlessly sets out to seduce the husband of her employer and steal him away from her. It was the final novel of Whipple who had been a popular writer in the 1930s and 1940s. It was republished in 1999 by Persephone Books. A dramatization was broadcast on BBC Radio Four in 2022.

References

Bibliography
 Lethbridge, Lucy. Servants: A Downstairs History of Britain from the Nineteenth Century to Modern Times. W. W. Norton & Company, 2013.
 Sponenberg, Ashlie. Encyclopedia of British Women’s Writing 1900–1950. Springer,  2006.
 Turner, Nick. Post-War British Women Novelists and the Canon. Bloomsbury Publishing,  2011.

1953 British novels
Novels by Dorothy Whipple
Novels set in England
John Murray (publishing house) books